Eddie Kelly may refer to:

 Eddie Kelly (footballer) (Edward Patrick Kelly, born 1951), Scottish former football player
 Eddie Kelly (hurler) (Éamonn Ó Ceallaigh, born 1939), Irish retired hurler
 Eddie Kelly (boxer) (1885–?), American World Featherweight Boxing Contender

See also
Edward Kelly (disambiguation)